Moungo is a department of Littoral Province in Cameroon. The department covers an area of 3,723 km and as of 2001 had a total population of 452,722. The capital of the department lies at Nkongsamba.

Subdivisions
The department is divided administratively into 12 communes and in turn into villages.

Communes 
 Baré
 Bonaléa
 Dibombari
 Ebone
 Loum
 Manjo
 Mbanga
 Melong
 Mombo
 Nkongsamba 1
 Nkongsamba 2
 Nkongsamba 3
 Penja

References

Departments of Cameroon
Littoral Region (Cameroon)